Niall Martin Keown (born 5 April 1995) is a former professional footballer who played as a defender. He began his career with Reading before joining Partick Thistle in 2017, initially on loan. Born in England, he has represented the Republic of Ireland under-21 team. He is the son of former Arsenal and England international Martin Keown.

Club career

Reading
Keown joined the Reading Academy in 2011.

He made his debut, for Reading in their 2–1 Championship victory over Brighton & Hove Albion on 10 March 2015, coming on as a 92nd-minute substitute for Danny Williams.

Keown signed a new three-year contract with Reading on 14 July 2015.

Partick Thistle
In January 2017, Keown went on trial with Partick Thistle, featuring for them in their friendly against Lokeren, before signing on loan with Partick Thistle for the remainder of the season on 24 January 2017.

On 1 July 2017, Keown moved to Partick Thistle permanently on a two-year contract from Reading for an undisclosed fee. Following Partick Thistle's relegation at the end of the 2017–18 season, Keown was put up for sale by Thistle.

With his contract due to expire at the end of the 2018–19 season, Keown was loaned to St Johnstone in January 2019.

International career
In March 2015, Keown was called up to the Republic of Ireland U21 squad being eligible through his grandmother, having previously been a back up for the England U18s. He is also eligible to play for Northern Ireland as his grandfather was from County Fermanagh. He has indicated he wishes to switch international allegiance and represent Northern Ireland.

Career statistics

Honours

Club
Reading U21
 U21 Premier League Cup: 2013–14

Personal life
Niall is the son of former England international Martin Keown. Through his paternal grandmother, he is eligible to play for the Republic of Ireland, and he is also eligible to play for Northern Ireland because his paternal grandfather was born in County Fermanagh.

References

External links
Niall Keown profile at Reading F.C.

1995 births
Living people
Republic of Ireland association footballers
Republic of Ireland under-21 international footballers
English footballers
English people of Irish descent
Association football defenders
Reading F.C. players
English Football League players
Partick Thistle F.C. players
Scottish Professional Football League players
St Johnstone F.C. players